Rachias timbo is a mygalomorph spider of Argentina, named after its type locality: El Timbó, Iguazú, Misiones. R. timbo differs from Brazilian Rachias species (with similar genitalia) by being smaller and having lower keels on the male embolus.

Description
Its sternum measures  in length, width  and has a thin reborder. Serrula were absent. Chelicerae: rastellum formed by strong, thick but long and attenuate setae. Its inner margin had 10 or 11 small, widely spaced teeth. Its cephalothorax and femora of legs and palpi were greenish-bluish brown; patellae and the rest of its joints were orange brown. Its abdomen was yellowish-brown with dorsal mottling.

Distribution
Misiones Province.

See also
Spider anatomy
List of Nemesiidae species

References

External links
 ITIS entry
 ADW entry
EOL entry
BioLib entry
ZipcodeZoo entry

Nemesiidae
Spiders of Argentina
Spiders described in 1995